Crnobuki is a village in the Bitola Municipality of North Macedonia.

Demographics
Crnobuki is attested in the Ottoman defter of 1467/68 as a village in the vilayet of Manastir. The inhabitants attested bore mixed Slavic-Albanian anthroponyms, such as Petko, son of Gjin, Pejo, son of Gjergj, Dimitri son of Manko.

According to the 2002 census, it has a population of 406.

Sports
The local football club FK Crno Buki ZL plays in the Macedonian Third Football League.

References

Villages in Bitola Municipality